Dun Skudiburgh is a prehistoric fort near Uig, Skye, Scotland.

Description
The site consists of a partly vitrified fort overlaid by a dun.

There is an entrance between the outer of these walls and the wall to the east.

It is thought there were at least two phases of construction of the dun: walls of poorer quality have been discerned to the west, south and south-east.

References

Hill forts in Scotland
Archaeological sites in Highland (council area)
Isle of Skye